Vincent's least gecko (Sphaerodactylus vincenti) is a species of lizard in the family Sphaerodactylidae. The species is endemic to the Caribbean.

Geographic range 

S. vincenti is found on the Windward Islands except for the southernmost island in the chain — Grenada, namely, on the islands of Dominica, Martinique, Saint Lucia, and Saint Vincent.

Habitat
The preferred habitats of S. vincenti are forest and shrubland. Population density is greatest in moist, shaded leaf-litter. These microhabitats provide shelter, access to prey, and protection against desiccation.

Reproduction
S. vincenti is oviparous.

Etymology
The specific name, vincenti, refers to the island of Saint Vincent.

Subspecies
Including the nominotypical subspecies, ten subspecies are recognized as being valid.
Sphaerodactylus vincenti adamas 
Sphaerodactylus vincenti diamesus 
Sphaerodactylus vincenti festus 
Sphaerodactylus vincenti josephinae 
Sphaerodactylus vincenti monilifer 
Sphaerodactylus vincenti paulmarinae 
Sphaerodactylus vincenti pheristus 
Sphaerodactylus vincenti psammius 
Sphaerodactylus vincenti ronaldi 
Sphaerodactylus vincenti vincenti

References

Further reading

Barbour T (1921). "Sphaerodactylus ". Memoirs of the Museum of Comparative Zoology at Harvard College 47 (3): 215-282 + Plates 1-26. (Sphaerodactylus vincenti, pp. 270–271 + Plate 9, figure 3; Plate 26, figures 1–4).
Boulenger GA (1891). "On Reptiles, Batrachians, and Fishes from the Lesser West Indies". Proc. Zool. Soc. London 1891: 351–357. (Sphærodactylus vincenti, new species, p. 354).

Rösler H (2000). "Kommentierte Liste der rezent, subrezent und fossil bekannten Geckotaxa (Reptilia: Gekkonomorpha)". Gekkota 2: 28–153. (Sphaerodactylus vincenti, p. 114). (in German).
Schwartz A, Henderson RW (1991). Amphibians and Reptiles of the West Indies: Descriptions, Distributions, and Natural History. Gainesville, Florida: University of Florida Press. 720 pp. . (Sphaerodactylus vincenti, p. 544).
Schwartz A, Thomas R (1975). A Check-list of West Indian Amphibians and Reptiles. Carnegie Museum of Natural History Special Publication No. 1. Pittsburgh, Pennsylvania: Carnegie Museum of Natural History. 216 pp. (Sphaerodactylus vincenti, pp. 163–164).

External links

Sphaerodactylus vincenti at the Encyclopedia of Life

Sphaerodactylus
Lizards of the Caribbean
Reptiles of Dominica
Fauna of Martinique
Reptiles of Saint Lucia
Fauna of Saint Vincent and the Grenadines
Reptiles described in 1891